Andrew Peters Wiswell (July 11, 1852 – December 4, 1906) was a justice of the Maine Supreme Judicial Court from April 10, 1893, to December 4, 1906, serving as chief justice from January 2, 1900, to December 4, 1906.

Born in Ellsworth, Maine, Wiswell graduated from Bowdoin College in 1873, and read law to be admitted to the bar the following year. He was Speaker of the Maine House of Representatives in 1891. Appointed an Associate Justice April 10, 1893, he became chief justice on January 2, 1900, and served in that capacity until his death.

He died unexpectedly at the Hotel Touraine in Boston on December 4, 1906.

References

1852 births
1906 deaths
Bowdoin College alumni
People from Ellsworth, Maine
Justices of the Maine Supreme Judicial Court
Speakers of the Maine House of Representatives
U.S. state supreme court judges admitted to the practice of law by reading law
19th-century American politicians
19th-century American judges